Walter Julián Martínez Ramos (28 March 1982 – 11 August 2019) was a Honduran professional footballer who played as a striker.

Club career
Martínez started his professional career at Victoria and made his debut on 25 November 2000 against Deportes Savio. He also played for Vida in La Ceiba, and Marathón in San Pedro Sula.

On 27 January 2007, Diario Deportivo Diez confirmed that he would play for Beijing Guoan of China, where he would play four seasons over two separate spells. In July 2010 he was presented there for his second stint.

In January 2011, Martínez became the 11th Honduran footballer in the Spanish league after joining Alavés.

After his contract with Chongqing ended, Martínez had a trial with Major League Soccer side Colorado Rapids in January 2013 and D.C. United in February 2013. On 15 March 2013, Martínez signed with the San Jose Earthquakes.

International career
Martínez made his debut for Honduras in a November 2002 friendly match against Colombia and has earned a total of 49 caps, scoring 12 goals. He has represented his country in 8 FIFA World Cup qualification matches and played in all three of his country's games at the 2010 FIFA World Cup. He also played at the 2003 and 2009 UNCAF Nations Cups and the 2011 Copa Centroamericana, as well as at the 2009 and 2011 CONCACAF Gold Cups.

Honors
 CONCACAF Gold Cup All-Tournament Team: 2009
  Champion of 2018 Chinese City Football Super League（CFL）

Death
On 11 August 2019, Martínez died in New York City due to cardiovascular disease.

References

External links
 

1982 births
2019 deaths
Sportspeople from Tegucigalpa
Association football midfielders
Honduran footballers
Afro-Honduran
Honduras international footballers
C.D. Victoria players
C.D.S. Vida players
C.D. Marathón players
Beijing Guoan F.C. players
Deportivo Alavés players
San Jose Earthquakes players
Liga Nacional de Fútbol Profesional de Honduras players
Xelajú MC players
Honduran expatriate footballers
Expatriate footballers in China
Expatriate footballers in Spain
Honduran expatriate sportspeople in China
Chinese Super League players
China League One players
Major League Soccer players
Copa Centroamericana-winning players
2003 UNCAF Nations Cup players
2007 CONCACAF Gold Cup players
2009 UNCAF Nations Cup players
2009 CONCACAF Gold Cup players
2010 FIFA World Cup players
2011 Copa Centroamericana players
2011 CONCACAF Gold Cup players